Siphonariidae, also known as false limpets, are a taxonomic family of small to medium-sized air-breathing sea snails, marine and brackish water pulmonate gastropod molluscs. 



Shell description
Empty siphonariid limpet shells can be distinguished from true limpet shells by examining the interior. In the siphonariids there is a well-marked lateral groove on the right side of the shell, and a corresponding interruption of the ring of muscle attachment scars. These markers show the positioning of the pneumostome or pulmonary orifice.

Genera
Genera in the family Siphonariidae include:
 Anthosiphonaria Kuroda & Habe, 1971 - 
 Anthosiphonaria sirius - 
 Aporemodon Robson, 1913
 Benhamina Finlay, 1927 - with the only one species Benhamina obliquata (G. B. Sowerby I, 1825)
 Ellsiphon Iredale, 1940
 Hebesiphon Iredale, 1940
 Heterosiphonaria Hubendick, 1945
 Hubendickula McAlpine, 1952
 Kerguelenella Powell, 1946 - synonym: Kerguelenia Mabille & Rochebrune, 1889
 Legosiphon Iredale, 1940
 Mallorisiphon Iredale, 1940
 Mestosiphon Iredale, 1940
 Pachysiphonaria Hubendick, 1945
 Parellsiphon Iredale, 1940
 Patellopsis Nobre, 1886
 Pugillaria Iredale, 1924
 Siphonacmaea Habe, 1958
 Siphonaria G. B. Sowerby I, 1823 - type genus of the family Siphonariidae
 Talisiphon Iredale, 1940
 Williamia Monterosato, 1884 - synonyms: Allerya Mörch, 1877; Brondelia Bourguignat, 1862; Parascutum Cossmann, 1890; Roya Iredale, 1912; Scutulum Monterosato, 1877.
Genera brought into synonymy
 Allerya Mörch, 1877: synonym of Williamia Monterosato, 1884
 Brondelia Bourguignat, 1862: synonym of Williamia Monterosato, 1884
 Ductosiphonaria Hubendick, 1945: synonym of Siphonaria Sowerby I, 1823
 Kerguelenia Mabille & Rochebrune, 1889: synonym of Kerguelenella Powell, 1946
 Liriola Dall, 1870: synonym of Siphonaria Sowerby I, 1823
 Mouretus Blainville, 1824: synonym of Siphonaria Sowerby I, 1823
 Parascutum Cossmann, 1890: synonym of Williamia Monterosato, 1884
 Planesiphon Zilch, 1959: synonym of Siphonaria G. B. Sowerby I, 1823
  Roya Iredale, 1912: synonym of Williamia Monterosato, 1884
 Scutulum Monterosato, 1877: synonym of Williamia Monterosato, 1884
 Siphonacmaea [sic] : synonym of Siphonacmea Habe, 1958

References

Further reading 
 Powell A W B, New Zealand Mollusca, William Collins Publishers Ltd, Auckland, New Zealand 1979 
 Vaught, K.C. (1989). A classification of the living Mollusca. American Malacologists: Melbourne, FL (USA). . XII, 195 pp.

External links 
 

 
Taxa named by John Edward Gray